Moonbase 3 is a British science fiction television programme that ran for six episodes in 1973. It was a co-production between the BBC, 20th Century Fox and the American ABC network. Created by Doctor Who producer Barry Letts and script editor Terrance Dicks as a realistic alternative strand of TV science-fiction, it was not a commercial or critical success (Dicks himself has stated in a foreword to a collection of Tom Baker-era Doctor Who scripts that they "overdid the grimness and forgot about the sense of wonder that science fiction is all about").

It starred Donald Houston as Director David Caulder, who is appointed to the position after the previous director was killed while returning to Earth.  Ralph Bates was Michel Lebrun, the deputy director, who was concerned about keeping to the rules.  Fiona Gaunt played Doctor Helen Smith, the base's psychiatrist, and Barry Lowe played Tom Hill, the head of the base technical section.

The programme was notable for its combination of realistic spaceflight procedures, ensured by hiring BBC technical adviser James Burke, and its strong character-based writing. Although very dated in terms of its looks and assumptions about the future, it remains well regarded in retrospect.

Concept and setting
Moonbase 3 was set in the year 2003 – some 30 years into the future at time of broadcast – and dramatised life in the enclosed environment of the titular moonbase. Five world powers have colonised the Moon: America (Moonbase 1, commanded by Bill Jackson), Russia (Moonbase 2), Europe (Moonbase 3), China (Moonbase 4, commanded by General Cheng) and Brazil (Moonbase 5). The European Moonbase 3 has been in existence for 8 years at the time the series starts. With oversight provided by the European Space Assembly and the European Aeronautics and Space Administration, Moonbase 3 is a shoestring operation when compared with the Russian and American efforts and much of base director David Caulder's job is to stave off budget cuts or a complete shutdown in the face of sceptical bureaucrats.

Alongside technical problems such as stranded astronauts, explosive decompressions and failed experiments, the inhabitants of the moonbase must also deal with psychological problems arising from the cramped, dangerous environment they live in. In "Departure and Arrival", a mental breakdown suffered by a shuttle pilot has tragic consequences. "Achilles Heel" and "Outsiders" deal with the fallout from crew members' difficulty with living up to the standards they have set for themselves.  "Behemoth" and "View of a Dead Planet" deal with forms of mass hysteria.

Principal characters

Dr David Caulder (Donald Houston)
Appointed Director of Moonbase 3 following the death of his predecessor, David Caulder is a scientist, academic and administrator. A lecturer at the University of Oxford, he rose to prominence when he was appointed Chancellor of the University during a period of student unrest and managed to calm the situation down, earning him a reputation as a "Welsh wizard". The Director-General of the European space effort describes Caulder as a "militant liberal, passionately committed to the middle of the road". Caulder sees himself as a buffer, who deals with the political aspects of running the moonbase, giving the others the room to perform the vital tasks of keeping Moonbase 3 operations going.

Dr Michel Lebrun (Ralph Bates)
Deputy Director Michel Lebrun is noted for his rigid adherence to the rules and procedures, making him a somewhat inflexible individual who has difficulty understanding the human dimension involved when dealing with other base personnel. The Frenchman is slightly resentful of Caulder's appointment to the position of Director, feeling that he has been overlooked for the job though Helen Smith reminds him that he is, perhaps, too young to take up the position at this time. However, when he is ordered to relieve Caulder of command during the attempted rescue of Tom Hill in the episode "Castor and Pollux", he remains loyal to Caulder and carries out the rescue as planned despite his misgivings about the risks.

Dr Helen Smith (Fiona Gaunt)
Helen Smith is the base psychologist responsible for preparing regular psychological record reports (or PSIs), assessing the mental state of all personnel. An expert in behavioural studies in an alien environment – her thesis was titled "Human beings adjust" – she acts as a sounding board, enabling individual crew members to adapt to the situation of life on the Moon. However, she develops a trend of engaging in romantic relationships with her most troubled patients as seen in "Achilles Heel" and "Outsiders".

Tom Hill (Barry Lowe)
Forty-two-year-old Tom Hill is director of operations on the moonbase responsible for flight control and base maintenance. An experienced astronaut, he became a minor celebrity six years before the events of the series take place when he rescued an escaped cat from a spacelab. A down-to-earth no-nonsense type, who dislikes having his work interfered with by management, he generally tries to maintain an informal, casual air, calling all female staff as "love" and calling Lebrun "Mickey boy", a moniker Lebrun hates. However, unhappy about the way Caulder conducted the investigation of his predecessor's death in "Departure and Arrival", Hill initially maintains a strictly businesslike relationship with Caulder before their relationship thaws in later episodes.

Production

Origins
Terrance Dicks and Barry Letts had been working together, as script editor and producer respectively, on Doctor Who since 1970.  Dicks had begun his television writing career on The Avengers and Crossroads before joining Doctor Who as its script editor in 1968. Former actor Barry Letts had changed career into television direction in 1967 and had worked on series such as Z-Cars and The Newcomers before being asked to take over as producer of Doctor Who in 1970, where he first met Dicks. In 1972, looking to move on from Doctor Who, the pair started considering a number of ideas for other shows they could collaborate on. Their first idea arose from the successful collaboration they had with the Royal Navy on the Doctor Who serial The Sea Devils which led to them considering pitching a serial set on a frigate only to find they were too late – the BBC had just commissioned a series, Warship, with that very premise. In late 1972, they developed the concept of Moonbase 3, as an anthology series set on a lunar colony that would "provide intelligent, realistic drama rather than Science Fantasy", and submitted a pilot script, titled "Departure and Arrival", to Shaun Sutton, the Head of Drama at the BBC. The series was formally commissioned in December 1972 and would be made, as a co-production between the BBC and 20th Century Fox and the ABC network in America, during the break in production between Seasons 10 and 11 of Doctor Who.

Production
The first Moonbase 3 script to be formally commissioned was "View of a Dead Planet" on 15 December 1972.  This was written by Arden Winch, a respected writer who had written for The Wednesday Play. Two scripts, "Behemoth" and "Outsiders", were commissioned from John Brason, who had written for Colditz and Special Branch. The final two scripts, "The Dark Side of the Moon" and "The Gentle Rain" (later renamed "Castor and Pollux" and "Achilles Heel" respectively), were commissioned from John Lucarotti, a prolific writer whose credits included The Avengers, Doctor Who and The Troubleshooters. Lastly, Letts and Dicks retrospectively commissioned themselves in late May 1973 for their pilot script "Departure and Arrival".

In order to achieve a high level of realism, Letts and Dicks hired a technical advisor, James Burke, a science correspondent who was well known to television viewers thanks to his work as anchorman on the television coverage of the Apollo moon landings and for presenting science series such as Tomorrow's World and The Burke Special. Burke decided that 2003 would be a realistic date for bases to have been established on the Moon, telling the Radio Times that "Men won't go back to the Moon until the 1990s. Neither the Russians nor the Americans have any plans at present and no-one else can afford it. [...] As for the base itself – it should look exactly as it would if they built one tomorrow. [...] They'd be small, supporting 30 or 40 men and running on a shoestring. [...] It'll be like life on a nuclear submarine".

Cast as David Caulder was Donald Houston, an experienced character actor, who had appeared in 633 Squadron and The Longest Day, and was known for playing authority figures. Ralph Bates, who was cast as Michel Lebrun, had first made a name for himself playing the Emperor Caligula in the Granada Television series The Caesars but was best known as a regular actor in the Hammer horror stable. Fiona Gaunt, playing Helen Smith, had been in a television adaptation of War and Peace while Barry Lowe, playing Tom Hill, had been a regular on the police drama Z-Cars.

Two directors were assigned to the series – Ken Hannam and Christopher Barry. Hannam had previously directed such series as Colditz and Paul Temple while Barry had worked extensively on Doctor Who, having directed some 31 episodes at the time, including the stories The Dæmons and The Mutants for Letts and Dicks, as well as episodes of Out of the Unknown, Paul Temple and The Onedin Line. Hannam and Barry alternated directing the episodes between them with filming on Moonbase 3 beginning on 24 April 1973 at the BBC film studios in Ealing. The Ealing filming mainly centred around the scenes set on the lunar surface which proved a difficult experience for the actors. Star Donald Houston told the Radio Times that the spacesuits got "hot and claustrophobic. In the end they had to have oxygen standing by. [...] the dust rose in clouds and the cameramen all wore surgical masks. The actors just choked". Recalling his guest appearance on Moonbase 3, in the episode "Behemoth", Peter Miles told TV Zone in 1991 that he was "asked to be like a gazelle and leap as I came down the hillock in full astronaut gear. [...] The tech crew wondered why I was steaming up furiously in my astronaut's head. They'd forgotten to put air holes into the helmet. [...] I said, 'Help help! Help help! I'm not breathing folks!' They took the helmet off before drilling the holes or I wouldn't be here now". Filming continued at Ealing until 30 May 1973 before production moved to BBC Television Centre for the remaining scenes, mostly those set inside the moonbase, which would be recorded on videotape beginning on 18 June 1973. The episodes were recorded in a different order than that in which they were broadcast with "Departure and Arrival" recorded first followed by "Castor and Pollux", "Behemoth", "View of a Dead Planet", "Outsiders" and, lastly, "Achilles Heel" with recording wrapping on 15 August 1973. Music was provided by Dudley Simpson who, at this time, was the regular composer on Doctor Who. Simpson composed the main title theme that accompanied the opening and closing credits as well as approximately 60 minutes of incidental music.

Transmission and audience reaction
Moonbase 3 was promoted by the Radio Times on the week of broadcast with a two-page article by Mike Bygrave, titled "The Facts of Life on the Moon", that interviewed James Burke about his ideas of life on the Moon and also spoke to star Donald Houston, dresser Leslie Hallam and costume designer Dee Kelly about their experiences making the show. Broadcast on Sunday nights at 7:25pm on BBC One, audience reaction to the series was disappointing with the debut episode garnering under 6 million viewers and ratings slipping as low as 2 million in subsequent weeks before stabilising at 4 million. A BBC Audience Research report slated the series as "banal, predictable and slow". Reviewing "Departure and Arrival" in The Observer, Clive James described the plot as "the Yangtze Incident plus liquid oxygen".

Archive status
As was normal procedure at the BBC at the time, the original PAL master tapes of the series were wiped some time after broadcast and, for many years, Moonbase 3 was believed to be lost forever.  However, in 1993, NTSC copies of all six episodes were found in co-producer Fox's archives and returned to the BBC. The series was subsequently released on VHS videotape over three volumes in 1994 by BBC Video and on DVD in 2002 by Second Sight.

Legacy
Terrance Dicks has felt that Moonbase 3 was ultimately a failure: "The trouble was we built a too restrictive format for ourselves" and that the series "lacked a sense of wonder and outrageousness". Academic Peter Wright has said about Moonbase 3 that its "appeal to realism resulted in a disquieting sense of claustrophobia and isolation that undermined the optimism of its premise and captured the general mood of insularity felt (and often desired) in Britain in the early 1970s".  Moonbase 3, although not directly influential, can be seen as an antecedent of similar realistic, near-future, British space series such as Space: 1999, Star Cops and Space Island One.

Episode guide
Six episodes of Moonbase 3 were made and broadcast on BBC One on Sunday nights at 7:25pm beginning on 9 September 1973.

References

External links

Moonbase 3 at OldFutures

BBC television dramas
1970s British science fiction television series
1970s British drama television series
Television series about the Moon
1973 British television series debuts
1973 British television series endings
Space adventure television series
Television series by BBC Studios
Television series by 20th Century Fox Television